Durnevo is a rural locality (a village) in Novlenskoye Rural Settlement, Vologodsky District, Vologda Oblast, Russia. The population was 3 as of 2002.

Geography 
Durnevo is located 50 km northwest of Vologda (the district's administrative centre) by road. Ostretsovo is the nearest rural locality.

References 

Rural localities in Vologodsky District